The World of Skin is an anthology album by The World of Skin, released in 1988 by Product Inc.

Track listing

Personnel
Adapted from The World of Skin liner notes.
 Howie Weinberg – mastering

Release history

References

External links 
 

1988 compilation albums
Albums produced by Michael Gira